Palestinian Uruguayans are Uruguayan citizens of Palestinian descent or Palestine-born people residing in Uruguay. There are approximately 5000 Uruguayans with Palestinian ancestry, mostly living on the Brazilian border. Most of them in Chuy, where they run their own mosque and association, others in Rivera.

The majority of Palestinian Uruguayans are Muslim, with a tiny Christian minority.

See also 
 Palestine–Uruguay relations
 Palestinian diaspora
 Arab Uruguayan

References

State of Palestine–Uruguay relations
Uruguay
Arab Uruguayan
Ethnic groups in Uruguay
Immigration to Uruguay